Andriy Oleksiyovych Reva (7 July 1966 in Bohodukhiv, Kharkiv Oblast) is a Ukrainian politician.

References

External links
 Andriy Reva at the Government of Ukraine website

1966 births
Living people
People from Bohodukhiv
Social policy ministers of Ukraine